is a Japanese tokusatsu drama in the Kamen Rider metaseries, written by Gen Urobuchi. Characters are aligned with each other as members of dance crews, or Beat Riders, and various organizations.

Main characters

Kota Kazuraba
 is an earnest and cheerful yet naïve and short-sighted young adult who wants to help others, but sometimes ends up causing more trouble than good. He was originally the second-in-command of Team Gaim before quitting the team to pursue odd jobs and help his older sister, Akira, after their parents died, before eventually getting a job at Drupers. However, his life is changed after Team Gaim's leader Yuya Sumii arranges a meeting with Kota to show him something that could help their team. This leads Kota to search for Sumii in what he later learns is the Helheim Forest, finding a Sengoku Driver that his friend bought from the mysterious Lockseed Dealer Sid, and an Inves that Kota manages to destroy via the Driver and a Lockseed. While figuring out how best to use his newly acquired powers, Kota witnesses his rival, Kaito Kumon's, summoned Inves go on a rampage and becomes determined to protect people as the samurai-themed Kamen Rider Gaim. After he rejoins Team Gaim in the apparently missing Sumii's stead, Kota inspires others to become Armored Riders themselves.

Kaito Kumon
 is the brooding leader of Team Baron who bears a strong hatred towards the Yggdrasil Corporation, who bought out his father's construction company as part of their redevelopment plans for Zawame. As a result, Kumon grew up in a poor household, his father became abusive towards him and his mother, and both of his parents eventually committed suicide, leading to the orphaned Kumon falling into the Takatsukasa family's care. This childhood cemented a survival of the fittest-like mentality in his later years and fostered a personal desire to acquire power for himself as he believes he cannot trust anyone else. 

Mitsuzane Kureshima
Despite going to an elite school, Mitsuzane wishes to follow his own path rather than follow in his brother's. After his friend Kota Kazuraba is nearly killed by Kamen Rider Zangetsu, Mitsuzane convinces Sid to give him a Sengoku Driver so he can become Team Gaim's second Armored Rider, the Chinese soldier/dragon-themed . Upon discovering Takatora is Zangetsu, Mitsuzane initially resolves to uncover the truth behind the Yggdrasil Corporation's ties to the Helheim Forest. However, his desire to protect Kota and their mutual friend Mai Takatsukasa from the truth and discovery of what happened to Team Gaim member Yuya Sumii leads Mitsuzane to help Takatora conceal information on the Helheim Forest instead.

Mai Takatsukasa
 is a member of Team Gaim who originally worked as a shrine maiden at the Takatsukasa Shrine as a child before the Yggdrasil Corporation tore it down as part of their redevelopment plans for Zawame. Having learned to dance in her youth, she believes her transition into a Beat Rider does not affect her ideals as she tries to teach the others how to dance better, becoming an older sister figure to them.

Takatora Kureshima
 is Mitsuzane's older brother and a project leader in the Yggdrasil Corporation's Research and Development branch. A realist who is willing to commit morally dubious acts for the greater good of humanity, he has a bad habit of trusting the dishonest and dearly loves his younger brother, desiring for him to do well in school so he can join the family business one day. Years prior to the series, Takatora proved instrumental in testing early prototypes for the Sengoku Driver. Despite experiencing setbacks that left him physically scarred, he eventually gained the means to become the samurai-themed  to combat the Helheim Forest's Inves.

Recurring characters

Team Baron
 is a rival dance team to Team Gaim, dressed in long black and red coats. While their leader Kaito Kumon is firmly against cheating, some of his fellow group members are prone to secretly doing so during Inves Games to increase their ranks until Kaito learns of what they have done.

Zack
 is a member of Team Baron who originally serves as Kaito Kumon's second-in-command and interim leader in his absence. Formerly a member of Team Severe Beat sometime prior to the series, they were defeated by Team Baron and Zack chose to defect, going on to develop a firm loyalty to him. After stealing a mass-produced Sengoku Driver while in the Yggdrasil Corporation's custody, Kumon entrusts it and leadership of Team Baron to Zack, who goes on to become the squire/boxer-themed .

Peko
 is a member of Team Baron who is loyal to Kaito Kumon yet willing to engage in underhanded tactics to aid his team. After Kumon leaves Team Baron and Zack takes over leadership as Kamen Rider Knuckle, Zack provides combat support to the latter. Amidst the Inves' invasion, Zack attempts to stop Mitsuzane Kureshima from kidnapping Mai Takatsukasa, but is nearly killed by an Overlord, forcing Takatsukasa to leave with Mitsuzane. When Kumon becomes an Overlord himself, Zack tasks Peko with making contact with Oren Pierre Alfonso to help defeat Kumon before Peko helps evacuate Zawame under the direction of the Japan Self-Defense Forces. Three months after the Inves are taken from Earth, Peko joins his fellow Beat Riders in forming a unified group.

Ryoji Hase
He initially refuses to join Team Baron's alliance until he is defeated by the group's leader Kaito Kumon's summoned Inves and Kota Kazuraba as Armored Rider Gaim, both of which convince Hase to do so. However, he later changes his mind, forms a separate alliance with Team Invitto's leader Hideyasu Jonouchi, and acquires a Sengoku Driver so he can transform into the ashigaru-themed .

Hideyasu Jonouchi
He initially joins Team Baron's alliance until he learns its leader Kaito Kumon only formed it to use the other members as pawns. In response, Jonouchi joins forces with Ryoji Hase of Team Raid Wild and obtains the means to transform into the Greek soldier-themed , but quickly becomes known as the weakest of the Armored Riders due to his lack of combat prowess and saddled with what he considers the worst name out of all them as it is simply an anagram of the Japanese word for "acorn".

Yggdrasill Corporation
The  is a powerful multinational conglomerate and research organization largely dedicated to stopping the Helheim Forest from overrunning the Earth. After detecting a high frequency of Crack portals in Zawame City, the company established the Yggdrasil Tower around the city's "sacred tree" for research purposes, disguising their true agenda by using their expertise in several fields and socioeconomic aspects of city-dwelling to redevelop Zawame to prevent widespread panic amongst the populace. Due to their omnipresence however, many of Zawame's citizens feel as if they are living in a "" rather than a bustling city. Yggdrasil also establishes the Inves Games and the Armored Riders to further their research and draw attention away from it as well as create weapons to repel Helheim's inhabitants.

Sid
 is one of Takatora Kureshima's subordinates who aids him by selling Lockseeds and Sengoku Drivers to the Beat Riders for the Inves Games. While he works for Yggdrasil, Sid's intentions are dubious at best as he is willing to aid various parties and withhold information on Mitsuzane Kureshima from Takatora. Prior to the series, Sid was part of a group of drug dealers who were suddenly attacked by Inves while they were in Zawame City. He survived the attack after being saved by Ryoma Sengoku and recruited into Yggdrasil.

Ryoma Sengoku
 is a brilliant scientist in the Yggdrasil Corporation's research division who conducts experiments to develop the Armored Riders' Drivers as part of Project Ark, a plan established by Yggdrasil to save one-seventh of the human population by providing them the means to obtain nutrients from Helheim Forest fruits without mutating into Inves. He was originally an orphan until he was taken in by Yggdrasil's owner, Amagi Kureshima, who recognized the boy's talents and potential for furthering Yggdrasil's goals. Over the years, Sengoku would go on to become Amagi's right hand, develop Lockseeds, and become acquainted with Amagi's eldest son, Takatora Kureshima. Despite this, Sengoku grew to see the latter as a fool for trying to save humanity first and lacking his father's ambition, leading to Ryoma secretly acting on his own agenda by obtaining the Forbidden Fruit and acquiring its power rather than save the world from the Inves. Following the events of the film Kamen Rider × Kamen Rider Gaim & Wizard: The Fateful Sengoku Movie Battle, Sengoku presents the completed Genesis Drivers to Takatora and other select Yggdrasil members while keeping one for himself so he can become the European knight-themed .

Yoko Minato
 is a former FBI agent and bodyguard for Ryoma Sengoku, whom he gives a Genesis Driver to so she can transform into the Arabian soldier-themed  following the events of the film Kamen Rider × Kamen Rider Gaim & Wizard: The Fateful Sengoku Movie Battle. Despite being a member of Yggdrasil and taking orders from Takatora Kureshima, her loyalties initially lie with Sengoku.

Kurokage Troopers
The  are the Yggdrasil Corporation's privately owned soldiers who function as support for their employers and are normally dispatched into Zawame City's streets to destroy any evidence related to the Helheim Forest. They all utilize mass-produced versions of the Sengoku Driver, the plentiful Matsubokkuri Lockseeds similarly to their template, Kamen Rider Kurokage, and the walker-esque  Lock Vehicles, which are accessed from the corresponding Lockseed.

Drupers
 is a  known for selling fruit parfaits and being Zawame City's most popular location amongst youths, especially the Beat Rider dance teams. Amidst the Inves' invasion, Drupers remains open and serves as a secondary base for the Armored Riders until the Japanese Self-Defense Forces arrive and close down the store to evacuate Zawame. As of the film Kamen Rider × Kamen Rider Drive & Gaim: Movie War Full Throttle, Drupers has long since re-opened and entered a partnership with the pastry shop, Charmant.

Kiyojiro Bando
 is the owner of Drupers who offers advice to his customers and cheers them up with a parfait.

Iyo
 is Bando's only staff member and waitress capable of holding her own in combat, having trained in the use of a bō and nunchaku.

"DJ Sagara"
 is the immortal embodiment of the Helheim Forest's will whose task is to observe and hasten evolution and see the future unfold in terms of who can obtain the Helheim Forest's power, the Golden Fruit, believing that one must shine to be remembered by others.

Inves
They were originally part of the Femushinmu race before the forest consumed their civilization and the inhabitants ate Helheim fruit, which mutated them into monsters. The Inves were originally believed to be products of the popular , created by the Yggdrasil Corporation, that can be summoned to Zawame City via Lockseeds, which open zipper-like portals called .

Overlords
The  are powerful, evolved Inves who rose above the ordinary kind, maintained their intelligence, gained the ability to manipulate the Helheim Forest's plant life, and teleport. Like the regular Inves, the Overlords were once the  race, the dominant species of their world before Helheim consumed it.

Dēmushu
 is a hot-tempered, anger-prone brute clad in  armor who enjoys fighting, seeing humans as weak , that deserve death by someone as strong as himself. He is the first of the Overlords that the Armored Riders encounter, with Kaito Kumon being his first opponent after Dēmushu struggles to communicate with him despite consulting a dictionary.

Redyue
 is a feminine, sinister, and sadistic Overlord clad in  armor who uses others as her personal play things until she discards them when they are of no more use to her. After the Armored Riders arrive in Helheim, she quickly takes to manipulating them, having lived in boredom after the Femushinmu civilization collapsed. Following an encounter with Mitsuzane Kureshima and Sid, Redyue feigns defeat before leading them to the Forbidden Fruit and manipulating the latter into attacking Roshuo. She later reveals to Mitsuzane her desire to claim the Forbidden Fruit's power for herself. To achieve this, she convinces Roshuo to give her the fruit in exchange for using Earth's technology to revive his queen, with the intention of betraying him later on. However, the Armored Riders' allies rescue her prisoners while she is furious to learn that Roshuo had already given the Forbidden Fruit to someone else and kills him before she is in turn killed by Kazuraba.

Roshuo
 is the leader of the Overlords clad in  armor who normally rests deep within the ruins of his former civilization and believes humans are no different from the Femushinmu. Having endured Helheim while it was consuming his world, Roshuo became its king and used the Forbidden Fruit to turn the world into one that reflects his ideals of the strong ruling over the weak. However, as those blessed by the forest slaughter those unable to fight back, Roshuo learned too late that his wish caused a conflict that destroyed the Femushinmu civilization, with his queen among the casualties. Expressing disgust for conflict, Roshuo uses his incredible psychic power to keep the remaining Overlords in check. He also observes Yggdrasil's research team, particularly their technology capable of using a Lockseed's power without turning their owner into an Inves.

Minor Overlords
: A -themed Overlord who serves under Redyue and wields a -like weapon called , which is capable of channeling and redirecting energy attacks. He is tasked with aiding Mitsuzane in an attempt on Kota's life, only to be destroyed by Kota as Kamen Rider Gaim.
: A white -themed Overlord who serves as Roshuo's guard and personal soldier, wields a  called . Tasked with assisting Redyue, he leads Inves in abducting Zawame's citizens so she can use them as batteries for her revival machine. He is destroyed by Kamen Riders Gaim and Baron.
: A -themed Overlord who serves under Redyue and wields a battle axe called . He is destroyed by Kamen Rider Gaim.
 Queen: Roshuo's dead wife who served as the Femushinmu civilization's Maiden of Fate, bestowing Roshuo the Femushinmu and humanity's Forbidden Fruits. Roshuo attempts to revive her via the fruits and human sacrifices, but the Armored Riders' allies foil the latter while he is convinced to relinquish humanity's Golden Fruit. She initially appears in silhouette within Roshuo's memories until his death, during which she appears to him as a spirit to comfort him.

Akira Kazuraba
 is Kota's older sister. Following their parents' deaths, she takes on an office job at an Yggdrasil Corporation-affiliated company. After learning her brother became Armored Rider Gaim, she becomes protective of him, though she comes to understand that he has his own desires and advises him on how best to use his abilities for the good of others. Unbeknownst to Akira, she is targeted by her employers, who seek to make Kota give up his Rider powers.

Oren Pierre Alfonso
, born , is an effeminate and muscular Parachute Regiment veteran who spent a decade in France to become a pâtissier and went on to become the owner of the  pastry shop in Zawame City. Disgusted by the Beat and Armored Riders' perceived destruction of art and being amateurs in combat, Alfonso confiscates Rider equipment from a Beat Rider so he can join the fray and show them how a true fight is meant to be fought as the gladiator/iron maiden-themed .

Guest characters
: Kota Kazuraba, Mitsuzane Kureshima, and Mai Takatsukasa's Beat Rider group clad in modern Happi-themed outfits.
: A tomboy member of Team Gaim and one of its best dancers. During the Inves' invasion, she provides medical assistance. Months after the Inves are taken from Earth, Chucky joins the other Beat Riders in forming a combined dance troupe. In the Kamen Rider Gaim tie-in novel, Chucky assists the Armored Riders in their fight against the Black Linden cult by going undercover as a follower of the latter group.
: A member of Team Gaim who is not as good as Chucky, but makes up for it by encouraging her friends. Months after the Inves are taken from Earth, Rica joins the other Beat Riders in forming a combined dance troupe.
: A member of Team Gaim who prefers flashy performances and often manages to bring up the team's mood after losses despite pushing his luck too far at times. After sustaining injuries while protecting Rica from the Bixie Inves, he is temporarily hospitalized and released shortly afterward upon testing negative for the Inves infection. Months after the Inves are taken from Earth, Rat joins the other Beat Riders in forming a combined dance troupe.
: The former leader of Team Gaim who went missing in the Helheim Forest after obtaining a Sengoku Driver from Sid. When Kota Kazuraba and Mai Takatsukasa stumble into the Helheim Forest in search of Yuya, they find his Sengoku Driver before the  attacks them. It follows them into the human world, where Kota transforms into Kamen Rider Gaim and destroys the Inves. Weeks later, while accessing the Yggdrasil Corporation's database, Mitsuzane learns that the White Tiger Inves was actually Sumii, who had transformed after he ate a Helheim Fruit. Though Mitsuzane tries to protect him from the truth, Kota is horrified once he learns that he unknowingly killed his friend before eventually making peace with the revelation.
: The leader of the Beat Rider group , whose members wear red, flame-themed clothing. Motivated by fame and freedom, he acquires a Sengoku Driver and the Durian Lockseed from the Lockseed Dealer Sid to challenge the other Beat Riders. However, he loses the equipment to Oren Pierre Alfonso. When the Beat Riders are framed for the Inves's infectious properties, Sonomura and his team take advantage by stealing Lockseeds and using them to summon Inves to help them commit robberies. When they are confronted by Kota Kazuraba, Sonomura uses a Lockseed to summon a Lion Inves, but the device shorts out and the monster nearly kills him until Kota destroys it.
: A group of children - Light, Tokacci, Mio, Hikari, and Kagura - with powerful imaginations who were aged up into young adults and recruited by the Rainbow Line to fight the Shadow Line. After making a stop in Zawame City, they cross paths with Kamen Rider Gaim while fighting members of the Badan Empire.
 / : An amnesiac android who Kota discovers and takes care of. While helping Jiro find his purpose, Kota discovers a reboot button on his back. While Jiro initially refuses to undergo the process, fearing he will become violent, he ultimately relents and leaves to fulfill his programming.
: An android created by the DARK Project that Ryoma Sengoku temporarily transplants his brain into as a favor to a colleague in the organization before returning to his own body due to Hakaider's programming influencing his personality.

Spin-off exclusive characters

Sengoku Period
This reality is exclusive to the film Kamen Rider × Kamen Rider Gaim & Wizard: The Fateful Sengoku Movie Battle.

Bujin Riders
The Bujin Riders, or simply , are alternate reality versions of the 14 Heisei Kamen Riders that preceded Gaim who each serve as a lord's champion. They are all defeated by Kamen Rider Bujin Gaim and consumed by the Pitcher Plant Monster:

, who serves under Hideyoshi
, who serves under Nobunaga

, who serves under Ieyasu.

Kamen Rider Bujin Gaim
 is an alternate reality version of Kamen Rider Gaim and a Bujin Rider who is considered the strongest Bujin. While attempting to obtain the power of his universe's sacred tree, he kills all of the Bujin Riders and attempts to kidnap the Maiden of Fate. However, he inadvertently kidnaps the Maiden's past self, Mai Takatsukasa, instead. He later merges with the sacred tree in an attempt to destroy the Armored Riders, but is killed by Kamen Riders Gaim and Wizard.

After fusing himself with the sacred tree, he assumes his  form.

Pitcher Plant Monster
The  is a monster that serves under Bujin Gaim and consumes the Bujin Riders to use their energy in the sacred tree. On Bujin Gaim's orders, the monster attacks the Armored Riders' dimension to kidnap the Maiden of Fate, only to grab Mai Takatsukasa instead. Her friends pursue the monster to the Sengoku dimension, but the Pitcher Plant Monster forces them to retreat. After attacking and capturing Kamen Rider Beast, Kamen Rider Wizard enters the Sengoku dimension to save his ally. The Pitcher Plant Monster is later killed by Kamen Riders Beast, Baron, Ryugen, and Zangetsu.

Ieyasu
 is the lord of the  who loses his Bujin, Kamen Rider Bujin Wizard, to Kamen Rider Bujin Gaim. Initially mistaking Kota Kazuraba for his Bujin's killer before realizing his mistake, Ieyasu hires the youth and Mitsuzane to become his new Bujins.

Ieyasu is portrayed by JOY.

Hideyoshi
He leads Kamen Rider Bujin W into battle against Bujin Gaim, but loses his Bujin to Zangetsu.

Chacha
 is the wife of Hideyoshi and the Sengoku Period counterpart of Akiko Terui (née Narumi).

Nobunaga
He sacrifices himself while rescuing his attendant Ranmaru from Bujin Gaim's army.

Ranmaru
 is a female attendant who serves under Nobunaga in the OOO Army. After Bujin OOO is killed by Bujin Gaim and Nobunaga sacrifices himself to save her, she makes Kamen Rider Baron the new lord and Bujin of the OOO Army.

Fourze Army Warlord
The unnamed  is an ally to Ieyasu's Wizard Army and the Sengoku Period counterpart of Kengo Utahoshi.

Kiva Army Warlord
The unnamed  is a rival to the Fourze Army Warlord and the Sengoku Period counterpart of Keisuke Nago / Kamen Rider IXA.

Shu Aoi
 is the deceased son of Ren and Saki Aoi, having died in a car crash a year prior, who appears exclusively in the film Heisei Riders vs. Shōwa Riders: Kamen Rider Taisen feat. Super Sentai. The former joins the Badan Empire to revive his son, only to be brainwashed so they can use Shu's powerful imagination to revive an army of monsters and destroy the world. However, Shu's powers revive him during the revival ceremony, leading to him running away and becoming part of a plan by the Shōwa and Heisei Riders to defeat Badan.

Saki Aoi
 is the wife of Ren and mother of Shu who appears exclusively in the film Heisei Riders vs. Shōwa Riders: Kamen Rider Taisen feat. Super Sentai.

Badan Empire
The , or Badan Empire for short, is an amalgamation of all of the previous evil groups that the first nine Shōwa Riders faced who wish to achieve world dominion, only to be foiled by the turncoat Kamen Rider ZX. Literally going underground, Badan resurfaces during the events of the crossover, "Ressha Sentai ToQger vs. Kamen Rider Gaim: Spring Break Combined Special" and the film Heisei Riders vs. Shōwa Riders: Kamen Rider Taisen feat. Super Sentai.

Ren Aoi
 is the husband of Saki Aoi and father of Shu Aoi who sought to revive his dead son, only to be to brainwashed by Badan into becoming their enforcer, . After being defeated by Kamen Rider Gaim, he is freed from his brainwashing and temporarily reunites with his family before Shu returns to the afterlife.

Utilizing a Sengoku Driver and the  Lockseed, Ren can transform into Kamen Rider Fifteen . While transformed, he wields the  sword. He also possesses the  Lockseed, which grants him access to the Heisei Riders' powers via unique Arms Changes, such as the following:

Wizard Arms: A Kamen Rider Wizard-themed form that grants Fifteen the use of the WizarSwordGun.
Fourze Arms: A Kamen Rider Fourze-themed form that grants Fifteen the use of States module weapons, such as the Barizun Sword and Billy the Rod.
: A Kamen Rider Gaim-themed form that grants Fifteen the use of the Daidaimaru and Musou Saber.
: A Kamen Rider Decade-themed form that grants Fifteen the use of the Ride Booker and the powers of the nine Heisei Riders that preceded Decade.

Moguraroid Brothers
The  Brothers are twin mole-themed Badan cyborgs tasked with digging holes to bring their compatriots to the surface. The elder brother accidentally opens Cracks that summon Inves before he is destroyed by Kamen Rider Gaim while the younger brother is destroyed by the ToQgers.

The Soccer World
The Soccer World is an alternate timeline created by Lapis, who grew tired of bloodshed and war, that appears exclusively in the film Kamen Rider Gaim: Great Soccer Battle! Golden Fruits Cup!.

Kogane
 is a manifestation of the Forbidden Fruit created by the previous Overlords in the past. When one of Ryoma Sengoku's experiments goes awry, Kogane awakens and kills him before taking on the form of a middle-aged man and creating a Locust Monster to either possess a human host to revive itself or infect humans and turn them into mindless monsters. Because of its existence on Earth, Kogane causes most of the Armored Riders to turn against each other in their search for the Golden Fruit. All the while, it masquerades as Yuya Sumii to get close to and manipulate Kota Kazuraba. It later defeats and brainwashes him into becoming its vassal, Kamen Rider Gaim Yami, to hunt down Lapis. However, Lapis enters Kota's mind and works to free him from Kogane's control. After losing his vassal, Kogane transforms into the European knight-themed  to destroy the Armored Riders, only to be defeated by them.

In the series finale, a time distortion causes Kogane to arrive in the primary timeline, where it possesses a teenage girl and becomes the samurai-themed  to seek revenge against the Armored Riders. It defeats Hideyasu Jonouchi, but after being cornered by Kamen Rider Ryugen, Kogane attempts to use its host as leverage until the primary timeline Kota returns to Earth and helps Ryugen free the girl and defeat Kogane.

Initially utilizing a Sengoku Driver and the  Lockseed, Kogane can transform into Kamen Rider Mars .

After appearing in the primary timeline, it utilizes a new Sengoku Driver and the  Lockseed to transform into Kamen Rider Jam . It can also combine the Dark Daidaimaru and Musou Saber to access the former's double-bladed , which allows it to perform the  finisher.

Locust Monster
The  is a monster created by Kogane, who used the power of the Golden Fruit to fuse a swarm of locusts together. It briefly appears during the series before Kota Kazuraba forces it to retreat. During the events of Kamen Rider Gaim: Great Soccer Battle! Golden Fruits Cup!, the Locust Monster attacks the Soccer World version of Kaito Kumon, who destroys the monster.

Another Locust Monster appears in the series finale, accompanying Kogane in his quest to seek revenge against the Armored Riders. It overpowers Hideyasu Jonouchi and Ryugen before Kota destroys it.

In battle, it has the ability to transform into a swarm of insects, which can infect people and turn them into mindless monsters or locate suitable hosts for Kogane.

Lapis
, aka , is the Soccer World counterpart of Kota who similarly became an Overlord. He uses his special bracelet to escape to Earth before the Helheim Forest was taken over by the Forbidden Fruit, unaware that the bracelet contained an evil entity created by another Overlord that would go on to become Kogane. Lapis eventually grew tired of the bloodshed and fighting he experienced on Earth and, following a chance encounter with Kota Kazuraba, used his powers to create an alternate reality where people play soccer instead of fight.

After Kogane attempts to corrupt his world, Lapis helps Kota and the Armored Riders fight back before DJ Sagara gives him the means to become the samurai warlord-themed  and help his friends defeat Kogane before disappearing.

Utilizing a Sengoku Driver and the  Lockseed, Lapis can transform into Kamen Rider Kamuro .

Megahex
 is a mechanical alien lifeform with the ability to assimilate worlds, having originally been his world's Man of the Beginning before using his wish to assimilate his entire world and become its core as Planet Megahex. From his perspective, individuality is a pointless concept and that absorbing others into his data system is beneficial. Coming across Kota Kazuraba and Mai Takatsukasa's planet, Megahex accessed the former's mind and learned of Earth's existence before seemingly destroying him and capturing Takatsukasa. Upon reaching Earth, Megahex creates facsimiles of Ryoma Sengoku and Kaito Kumon to serve him and assimilates the Cyberoid ZZZ android to become . However, the Kumon facsimile betrays him before ZZZ Megahex is weakened by Kota, the Armored Riders, Kamen Rider Drive, Mashin Chaser, Heart, and Brain before Kamen Riders Gaim and Drive travel to Planet Megahex and destroy the alien.

Amagi Kureshima
 is the patriarch of the Kureshima family with influence in the Yggdrasil Corporation and the father of Takatora and Mitsuzane who appears exclusively in the V-Cinema Gaim Gaiden: Kamen Rider Zangetsu. Years prior, he built a childcare facility for Zawame City's orphans, such as Tōka Akatsuki and Ryoma Sengoku, but secretly used the children to either conduct Helheim-related experiments on or select to work for Yggdrasil. In both cases, he made sure to teach them the concept of noblesse oblige, as his nobility was all that remained of his good nature. While Amagi was killed by a vengeful Akatsuki, his influence continued to linger in his sons, though Takatora was able to get out from his father's shadow.

Tōka Akatsuki
 is a servant of the Kureshima family and one of Amagi Kureshima's guinea pigs, whom he used in Helheim Forest-related experiments, who appears exclusively in the V-Cinema Gaim Gaiden: Kamen Rider Zangetsu. She eventually kills Amagi and steals the  Lockseed to destroy the man's legacy as the European knight-themed  After being confronted and defeated by Amagi's eldest son, Takatora Kureshima, she is secretly killed by Ryoma Sengoku, who takes the Forbidden Ringo Lockseed back.

Utilizing a Sengoku Driver and the Forbidden Ringo Lockseed, Tōka can transform into Kamen Rider Idunn . While transformed, she wields the Apple Reflector and the Sword Bringer.

Shapool
 is the heir of a foreign country who physically resembles Kaito Kumon and first appears in the V-Cinema Gaim Gaiden: Kamen Rider Baron. He visits Zawame City as part of an inspection, but escapes from his strict butler, Alfred, to seek out freedom instead. Shapool later locates, sedates, and masquerades as Kumon until his identity is immediately revealed after he attempts to use Kumon's Sengoku Driver, which is genetically locked to him. Even in spite of what happened, Kumon warns Shapool that Alfred wants to kill him. Once Alfred finds him, the former reveals his desire to kill Shapool and take his family's fortune for himself. With Kumon's help, Shapool narrowly escapes, and the two compare their life experiences. When Alfred attacks Kumon's friends, Shapool attempts to take responsibility, but Kumon convinces him to stay back. Once Kumon defeats Alfred, Shapool writes a message for the former, thanking Kumon for inspiring him to become strong, and returns to his country to speak with his father.

In the Kamen Rider Gaim tie-in novel, Shapool takes over his adopted father's foundation after the latter was arrested for supplying the Black Linden cult with Sengoku Drivers, forcing the young man to work feverishly to get the organization back on the right track.

Shapool is portrayed by Yutaka Kobayashi, who also portrays Kaito Kumon.

Alfred
 is Shapool's family's strict butler who appears exclusively in the V-Cinema Gaim Gaiden: Kamen Rider Baron. He secretly plans to murder his employers and take their fortune for himself, but when Kaito Kumon interferes with his plans, the butler receives help from Ryoma Sengoku, who gives him the means to become the European knight-themed . Unbeknownst to Alfred however, Sengoku was secretly using him to test the Dragon Fruits Energy Lockseed, which gradually turns the butler into the ox-like Overlord . After going on a rampage, Alfred is destroyed by Kamen Rider Baron.

Utilizing a Genesis Driver and the prototype Dragon Fruits Energy Lockseed, Alfred can transform into Kamen Rider Tyrant Dragon Energy Arms. While transformed, he wields a Sonic Arrow.

Kugai Kudo
 is a former researcher for the Yggdrasil Corporation and a colleague of Ryoma Sengoku until he was killed while testing the Ringo Lockseed. Kudo was trapped in a state of limbo until he received the Zakuro Lockseed from DJ Sagara and uses his newfound abilities to establish the  cult and lead them as their messiah claimant while using his brainwashed followers as expendable suicide bombers. In the V-Cinema Gaim Gaiden: Kamen Rider Duke, Kudo initially haunts Sengoku and menaces the Yggdrasil Corporation until the latter stops him as Kamen Rider Duke. Although it seemed that Kudo disappeared due to his Sengoku Driver being destroyed, he is able to manipulate his followers into recreating the belt and make his move during the events of the V-Cinema Kamen Rider Knuckle and the Kamen Rider Gaim tie-in novel, expanding the Black Linden cult outside of Japan by collaborating with Yggdrasil's remnants and Shura's Neo Baron team. Following Shura's death, Kudo instigates chaos in Zawame by creating Bodhi Tree-like roots that turn its citizens into mindless slaves before converting them into Overlord Inves. After failing to imprison the Armored Riders in a mental prison, Kudo uses his newly created Ringo Lockseeds to gain an advantage before the Armored Riders counter it with their new forms. Once Kota shatters his realm and frees the Armored Riders, the weakened Kudo finally dies as he is freed from his limbo.

Utilizing a Sengoku Driver, Genesis Core Unit, and the Blood Orange and  Lockseeds, Kudo can transform into the samurai/European knight-themed  .

Azami
 is Peko's sister and friend of Team Baron.

Shura
 is a former member of Team Baron who was ousted by Kaito Kumon prior to the series following a failed attempt to kill Kumon and take over leadership of Team Baron.

Utilizing a mass-produced Sengoku Driver and a Banana Lockseed, Shura can transform into Kamen Rider Black Baron Banana Arms. While transformed, he wields the Bana Spear.

Torkia Republic
The  is a fictional country that appears in the Kamen Rider Zangetsu: Gaim Gaiden stage show and its novelization Kamen Rider Gaim Gaiden: Kamen Rider Zangetsu. After its branch of the Yggdrasill Corporation activated the Scalar System, the Torkia Republic was destroyed and reduced to an underground city in which its low-ranking citizens were forced to fight against one another to survive while its noble residents live on the surface and benefit from the conflict as a form of entertainment. With the exception of the Shizumiya family, most citizens of the Torkia Republic's underground ruins are named after the 72 demons listed in the Ars Goetia.

The Torkia Republic's Armored Riders use prototype versions of Sengoku Drivers that allow them to assume black-colored versions of their Zawame City-counterparts. However, due to its incomplete system, it also slowly transforms them into Category H Inves.

: A faction that resembles Team Gaim and is led by Aym, who took over after the previous leader, Simon, went missing. At the start of the story, members of Orange Ride are reduced to three people after most of its members were killed.
: The former leader of team Orange Ride who went missing prior to the story. In the novelization, Simon suffers a similar fate as Yuya Sumii after obtaining a Sengoku Driver and was intended to become Proto Gaim, but ended up mutating into an Inves and was forced to be killed to put him out of his misery.
: The current leader of Orange Ride who shares Kota Kazuraba's idealism, but is willing to sacrifice others to save lives. Aym transforms into  to fight Glasya, but eventually becomes possessed by Kota's spirit to deliver the Kachidoki Lockseed to Takatora.
: A hot-blooded member who wields an iron pipe.
: A quiet member of the team.
: A team that resembles Team Baron, acts independently, and refuses to cooperate with outside forces regardless of their strengths.
: The cold leader of Baroque Red who shares Kaito Kumon's philosophy, respected and acknowledged Simon's strength. and hopes to overthrow the Torkia Republic's nobles from power. Glasya transforms into  to fight rival teams. After Foras' death, Glasya is defeated by Aym when their philosophies clash, acknowledging his rival's strength with his final breath. In the novelization, Glasya is revealed to have been a child from an impoverished family whose parents sold themselves to Yggdrasill as their test subjects before being turned into Inves and killed afterwards. Glasya's discovery of what happened shaped his mentality and desire to seek power and led to him accepting the prototype Sengoku Driver in spite of it slowly transforming him into an Inves.
: A warlike member who respects Glasya.
: A cool-headed member of Baroque Red.
: A team that resembles Teams Invitto and Raid Wild.
: The leader of the Green Dolls who resembles Ryoji Hase and Hideyasu Jonouchi and can transform into . After he is overthrown by Yukimura as the Green Dolls' leader, Foras slowly transforms into an Inves due to his Sengoku Driver's side effects and is given a mercy kill by Aym to stop his rampage. While details of Foras' background goes unstated in the stage show, the novelization portrays him as being respected by his teammates due to his kindness.
: A mercenary who overthrows Foras as the Green Dolls' leader. Displaying similar mannerisms as Oren Pierre Alfonzo, Yukimura transforms into  using equipment given to him by Kagiomi and is assigned to assassinate Takatora. After seeing Foras' mutation into an Inves, Yukimura cancels his contract with Kagiomi and allies himself with Takatora, rallying his men in fighting against Kagiomi's forces as Takatora marches his way to Masahito during the final battle.
Shizumiya family: A family of nobles.
: The main antagonist of the Kamen Rider Zangetsu: Gaim Gaiden stage show and the eldest son of the Shizumiya family. He was originally a good friend of Takatora who has a stable relationship with his family members and shares the Kureshima family's views on noblesse oblige. The Torkia Republic's population's gradual transformation into Inves leads to Masahito activating the Scalar System and seemingly dying from the explosion that destroyed their nation. In reality, he survived and mutated into an Overlord Inves form that resembles Redyue. During Takatora's visit to Torkia's ruins, Masahito ambushes his former friend, renders him amnesiac, and steals the equipment necessary to transform into Zangetsu. Seeking to lead mankind after deeming them incapable of correcting their own mistakes, Masahito hunts Takatora to prove their similarities and attacks Kagemasa. However, Takatora uses the Kachidoki Lockseed he received from Kota to defeat Masahito, who allows the former to kill him upon realizing his mistake so he can atone for his mistakes.
: The youngest son of the Shizumiya family who resembles Mitsuzane, is an old friend of Aym, and transforms into . Using his likeness with his counterpart, Kagemasa helps the amnesiac Takatora recover his memories in the hopes of killing him at his most vulnerable and avenging the seemingly deceased Masahito as Kagemasa blames Takatora for profiting off of what happened to the Torkia Republic and being hailed as a hero in Zawame. Upon discovering Masahito is alive and being attacked by him, Kagemasa gives Takatora his prototype Sengoku Driver so the latter can stop Masahito's reign of terror. While Kagemasa apparently dies in the stage show, it is revealed in the novelization that Aym saved him at the last minute.
: The patriarch of the Shizumiya family, a member of the Yggdrasil Corporation, and one of the Torkia Republic's nobles who engineered the war between Torkia's survivors for his own entertainment. After the failure of Project Ark weakens their connection with the Kureshima family, Kagiomi aims to take over the Yggdrasill Corporation for his own until he is killed by Masahito. While the stage show portrays him as a comical man, the novelization portrays him as a ruthless man who abuses his own children.

Masako Suzuka
 is Hideyasu Jonouchi's secretary, whom he hired sometime after succeeding Oren Pierre Alfonso as a pâtissier. Using the power of Helheim, she manipulates the former into unknowingly using deadly Helheim fruit in his new fruit cakes to transform customers into Inves and brainwash Alfonso into her mindless slave. However, her crimes are discovered by Takatora Kureshima, who defeats her and foils her plans while Jonouchi frees Alfonso from her control.

Utilizing a Sengoku Driver and the  Lockseed, Masako can transform into the Arabian soldier-themed  . While transformed, she wields the  spear.

Notes

References

External links
Cast on TV Asahi

Gaim characters
Characters
, Kamen Rider Gaim
, Kamen Rider Gaim